Clifford Henry Benn Kitchin (17 October 1895 – 4 April 1967) was a British novelist of the early twentieth century.

Biography
The elder son of Clifford Kitchin (1860–1913), a barrister, young Kitchin attended Clifton College and Exeter College, Oxford and, like his father before him, became a barrister. He was a gifted chess player, bridge player and pianist.

In the 1920s and 1930s Kitchin owned a house in Chiddingly, East Sussex.

Kitchin led a varied and colourful life. He was born into wealth and increased his wealth through investment in the stock market. He used his wealth to take part in many different fields, including the breeding and racing of greyhounds, in which he was briefly an important figure. He was homosexual, and was living with his lover Clive Bertram Preen until Preen's death in 1944.

He was best known for his four mystery novels featuring the sleuth Malcolm Warren (Death of My Aunt, Crime at Christmas, Death of His Uncle, and The Cornish Fox), but his other novels were also highly regarded, especially by other writers. His best-known novels are The Auction Sale, Streamers Waving, and Mr. Balcony. He was one of Francis King's two mentors, the other being J. R. Ackerley. His other works include The Book of Life, Ten Pollitt Place and Jumping Joan. Five of his novels with gay themes—The Sensitive One, Birthday Party, Ten Pollitt Place, The Book of Life, and A Short Walk in Williams Park—have been reprinted by Valancourt Books.

Works
Curtains.  Oxford: B.H. Blackwell, 1919. (poetry)
Winged Victory.  Oxford: B.H. Blackwell, 1920. (poetry)
Streamers Waving.  London: Hogarth Press, 1925.
Mr. Balcony.  London: Hogarth Press, 1927.
The Sensitive One.  London: Hogarth Press, 1931.
Olive E..  London: Constable & Co, 1937.
The Birthday Party.  London: Constable & Co, 1938.
The Auction Sale.  London: Secker & Warburg, 1949.
Jumping Joan and other stories.  London: Secker & Warburg, 1954.
The Secret River.  London: Secker & Warburg, 1956.
Ten Pollitt Place.  London: Secker & Warburg, 1957.
The Book of Life.  London: Peter Davies, 1960.
A Short Walk in Williams Park.  London: Chatto & Windus, 1971.

Malcolm Warren series
Death of My Aunt.  London: Hogarth Press, 1929.
Crime at Christmas.  London: Hogarth Press, 1934.
Death of His Uncle.  London: Constable & Co, 1939.
The Cornish Fox.  London: Secker & Warburg, 1949.

References

External links
 
 via knitting circle
 Valancourt Books biography
 

1895 births
1967 deaths
20th-century British male writers
20th-century British novelists
British male novelists
British mystery writers
English gay writers
English LGBT novelists
People educated at Clifton College
People from Chiddingly
20th-century English LGBT people